Inherit or Inherited may refer to:

 Inheritance, passing on of property after someone's death
 Heredity, passing of genetic traits to offspring
 Inheritance (object-oriented programming), way to compartmentalize and re-use computer code
 Inherit (album), 2008 work by the group Free Kitten
 Inherited (script), name for dependent script characters, like diacritics (ISO code )